Jeżowe  is a village in Nisko County, Subcarpathian Voivodeship, in south-eastern Poland. It is the seat of the gmina (administrative district) called Gmina Jeżowe.

The village has a population of 5,200.

Sparta Jeżowe 
Klub Sportowy Sparta Jeżowe is a Polish football club, which competes in the A-class, the seventh-tier of professional football. The club was founded in 1955, and has a blue-red color. The local stadium has 3,500 seats.

References

Villages in Nisko County
Kingdom of Galicia and Lodomeria
Lwów Voivodeship